Cicindela iberica is a species of common tiger beetle in the subgenus Cicindela that is endemic to Spain.

References

iberica
Beetles described in 1935
Endemic fauna of Spain